Masaharu Kono ( b. 1948) was a career diplomat.  He served as the Ambassador of Japan to Russia, Italy, Albania, Malta, and San Marino.  He presented his credentials to Russian President Dmitry Medvedev on 29 May 2009. In March 2011, was relieved of his position as ambassador to Russia.

In 2014, he was on the Olympic committee.

References

Living people
Ambassadors of Japan to Italy
Ambassadors of Japan to Russia
Recipients of the Royal Order of Sahametrei
University of Tokyo alumni
Year of birth missing (living people)
Consuls General of Japan in Los Angeles